Cucoara is a commune in Cahul District, Moldova. It is composed of two villages, Chircani and Cucoara.

References

Communes of Cahul District